The 1949 Florida A&M Rattlers football team was an American football team that represented Florida A&M University as a member of the Southern Intercollegiate Athletic Conference (SIAC) during the 1949 college football season. In their fifth season under head coach Jake Gaither, the Rattlers compiled a 7–2 record, won the SIAC championship, and outscored opponents by a total of 315 to 98. 

The team ranked No. 5 among the nation's black college football teams according to the Pittsburgh Courier and its Dickinson Rating System. The team's victories included three games against teams that were ranked in the final Pittsburgh Courier rankings: a victory over No. 10  and losses to No. 2 Southern and No. 8  in the Orange Blossom Classic. 

The team played its home games at Bragg Stadium in Tallahassee, Florida.

Schedule

References

Florida A&M
Florida A&M Rattlers football seasons
Florida A&M Rattlers football